Burning Love is a web and television comedy series that is a spoof of reality dating competition shows like The Bachelor and The Bachelorette. The show was created and written by Erica Oyama, while her husband, Ken Marino, co-produced, directed and starred in the series. Ben Stiller was one of the series' executive producers and appeared in a supporting role.

The show premiered on the web on Yahoo! Screen's Comedy Channel and was later picked up for television. In 2013, the series was nominated for an Emmy Award in the Outstanding Special Class - Short-format Live-Action Entertainment Programs category.

Cast

Season 1
 Ken Marino as Mark Orlando, the bachelor
 Michael Ian Black as Bill Tundle, the host

The contestants:
 Kristen Bell as Mandy, a devout Christian
 June Diane Raphael as Julie Gristlewhite, the "damaged goods" contestant
 Ken Jeong as Ballerina, the "exotic" contestant
 Malin Åkerman as Willow, a homeless woman
 Natasha Leggero as Haley, the sex freak
 Abigail Spencer as Annie, the "too perfect" contestant
 Carla Gallo as Tamara P, a blind contestant
 Helen Slayton-Hughes as Agnes, the older woman
 Noureen DeWulf as Titi, the rich contestant
 Morgan Walsh as Vivian, a pregnant contestant
 Jennifer Aniston as Dana, who keeps her identity secret
 Beth Dover as Lexie, a contestant obsessed with Mark
 Erin Muroski as Destiny, the desperate contestant
 Deanna Russo as Tamara G, who has a medical condition
 Janet Varney as Carly, a lesbian
 Erica Oyama as Shera

Other characters:
 Ben Stiller as Joe Rutherford, the previous season's bachelor
 Christine Taylor as Symphony, Joe's wife he picked from the previous season
 Cindy Caponera as Cindy
 Matt Ballard as Limo Driver
 Chris Farah as Kiki
 Colton Dunn as Tim, the medic
 Brian George as Raj
 Adam Scott as Damien, Mark's "psychiatrist"
 Mo Gaffney as Traci
 Matt Besser as Phil
 Brian Huskey as Hershel, Agnes' son
 Mather Zickel as Brock Glencoe, trainer to the stars
 Kerri Kenney-Silver as Jay, Mark's friend
 Ryan Hansen as the "Cowboy Waiter"
 Paul Scheer as Kip, a stand-up comedian
 Zandy Hartig as Owner of a Burning House

Season 2 cast
 June Diane Raphael as Julie Gristlewhite, the bachelorette
 Michael Ian Black as Bill Tundle, the host

The contestants:
 Adam Scott as Damien, Mark's former "psychologist"
 Joe Lo Truglio as Alex, the single dad who's emotional about not seeing his son
 Paul Scheer as Robby Z, a party motivator
 Rob Huebel as Simon, a prince
 Jerry O'Connell as Henry, a contractor from Provo, UT and an all-around good guy
 Adam Brody as Max, a decent human being who happens to be Jewish
 Michael Cera as Wally, an intellectual who is a hopeless romantic
 Colin Hanks as Allison, the classy one
 Martin Starr as Leo, the grown up premature baby
 Ryan Hansen as Blaze, the bad boy
 Nick Kroll as Khris, a baby-sitter who recently had a bad breakup
 Kumail Nanjiani as Zakir, the token ethnic contestant
 Nick Thune as Teddy, the musical one
 Brandon Johnson as Trevor, one of the bonus contestants

Other characters:
 Ben Stiller as Joe Rutherford, the bachelor from the show's (fictional) first season, now living in extreme poverty due to bad investments
 Christine Taylor as Symphony, Joe's wife
 Ken Marino as Mark Orlando, the previous season's bachelor
 Deanna Russo as Tamara G, who Mark has since broken up with
 Colton Dunn as Tim, the medic
 Abigail Spencer as Annie, bachelorette on the fictional "Burning Love: Hot for Teacher" season
 Paul Rudd as Annie's ex-fiancée
 Jessica St. Clair as Polly
 Katie Aselton as Idina Blimperson
 Rob Corddry as Lorenzo Blimperson
 Drew Droege as Cyrano Cruze-Shippe
 Rebecca Romijn as Katie
 Jensen Karp as Hot Karl
 Lindsey Kraft as Rebecca
 Janet Varney as Carly

Season 3 cast
 Michael Ian Black as Bill Tundle, the host

The contestants:
 June Diane Raphael as Julie, the "damaged goods" contestant (Mark's season, Julie's season)
 Joe Lo Truglio as Alex, the single dad who's emotional about not seeing his son (Julie's season)
 Natasha Leggero as Haley, the sex freak (Mark's season)
 Rob Huebel as Simon, a prince (Julie's season)
 Leslie Bibb as Bevarly, the southern party girl (Joe's season)
 Ryan Hansen as Blaze, the bad boy (Julie's season)
 Abigail Spencer as Annie, the "too perfect" contestant (Mark's season, Annie's season)
 Alex Anfanger as Noah, the virgin (Annie's season)
 Carly Craig as Felicia, the hot one (Joe's season)
 Kumail Nanjiani as Zakir, the bonus contestant (Julie's season)
 Helen Slayton-Hughes as Virginia, the twin of Agnes (from Mark's season), the older woman
 Armen Weitzman as Hathwell, the super fan
 Morgan Walsh as Vivian, a formerly pregnant contestant (Mark's season)
 Ken Marino as Mark, the sexy fireman (Mark's season)
 Christine Taylor as Symphony, the regretful winner (Joe's season)
 Beth Dover as Lexie, a contestant obsessed with Blaze (Mark's season)
 Janet Varney as Carly, the lesbian (Mark's season)
 Rob Delaney as Kirk, the life of the party (Annie's season)

Other characters:
 Thomas Lennon as Lev Realness, a pop singer who sleeps with Haley
 Casey Wilson as Aunt Pam, Julie's aunt who gives her and Mark relationship counseling over the phone.
 Jeff Ross as himself
 Seth Rogen as Roger, a trainee medic
 Colton Dunn as Tim, the medic
 Paul Scheer as Robby Z, who returns as a judge for the dancing competition
 Carla Gallo as Tamara P, who returns as a judge for the dancing competition
 David Wain as  Reg Durjmah, a "famed raincoat designer" who is the third judge for the dancing competition

Story and episodes
Depending on the season, the show either follows a man or a woman who is looking for the perfect mate from a pool of contestants, or has contestants living together in a mansion competing for a cash prize. Season one showcases fireman Mark Orlando (Ken Marino) as the bachelor. Season two of the series, which premiered in February 2013, stars June Diane Raphael reprising her role as season one contestant Julie, now the bachelorette given the chance to find the perfect man. Season three also premiered in 2013 and starred former contestants from seasons one and two competing for a $900 prize rather than for love (similar to Bachelor spin-off, Bachelor Pad).

Season chronology
The seasons of the show as listed do not match the internally referenced season chronology because of two fictitious seasons. Internally season one references the Joe Rutherford (Ben Stiller) season, and seasons two and three references the Annie (Abigail Spencer) season. Neither of these seasons was produced but occurred within the fiction of the show with events from those seasons being frequently mentioned during the course of various real episodes. Season three also announced a nonexistent season with superfan Hathwell Crisping.

Burning Love with Joe Rutherford (nonexistent)

1. Burning Love with Mark Orlando

Burning Love: Hot For Teacher (nonexistent) with Annie

2. Burning Love with Julie Gristlewhite

3. Burning Love: Burning Down The House

Burning Love: A Fanty Tale (nonexistent) with Hathwell Granger Crisping

Season 1

 1 Bachelor Mark decided that this contestant was who he wanted to propose to.
 † The after the final hose ceremony episode.

 The contestant was eliminated when bachelorettes first arrived.
 The contestant was eliminated during hose ceremony.
 The contestant was eliminated by other contestants.
 The contestant received hose on group date.
 The contestant was eliminated in episode 6 on one-on-one date.
 The contestant was eliminated in episode 8 for violating rules.
 The contestant was eliminated in episode 9 on two-on-one date.
 The contestant was eliminated in the final proposal ceremony.
 The contestant was proposed to and accepted proposal.
 The contestant was proposed to and rejected proposal.

Season 2

 * Both contestants were given the box simultaneously
 The contestant was eliminated at the box ceremony
 The contestant was eliminated for being too drunk, getting into a fight, and urinating in the wine cellar.
 The contestant was eliminated while on the puppet date for calling it 'dumb'
 The contestant left on his own for not being into Julie
 The contestant was given a box while on zoo date
 The contestant was given a box while on camping date
 The contestant left on his own since Julie isn't Jewish
 The contestant proposed to Julie but she rejected him
 The contestant proposed to Julie but then he had to bounce because he wasn't into Julie
 The contestant proposed to Julie who accepted but then removed her acceptance to accept Blaze's then Mark's Proposal
 The contestant proposed to Julie and she accepted

Season 3: Contestant standings by episode

 The contestant won the challenge
 The contestant was eliminated by other players
 The contestant quit
 The contestant was taken on a date by the challenge winner
 The contestant was taken on a date by the challenge winner and was granted immunity
 The contestant was forced to leave when she was arrested
 The contestant left because she was impregnated
 The contestant was eliminated when they lost the challenge
 The contestant returned because the rule book states that everyone needed a partner
 The contestant was voted by the other contestant as a member of the winning couple and chose the money over the relationship, therefore winning overall
 The contestant was voted by the other contestant as a member of the winning couple and chose the relationship over the money, therefore losing out on the prize money

Television
The first season of Burning Love had its worldwide television premiere on E! in Australia in January 2013 and E! in America on February 25, 2013. In Canada, the series premiered on Much; a sister to the local version of E!.

The first season premiered in the UK on Netflix in October 2013, edited into a 110-minute movie. The second season premiered on Australia's E! in February 2014, with the third season premiering on March 6, 2014.

Home media and streaming
Season one was released on DVD on November 12, 2013. A year later, seasons two and three were released together as a two-disc set on September 16, 2014.

The complete series is available on Pluto TV.

International adaptation
A French version of the series premiered on October 12, 2020 on Canal+. Titled La Flamme ( The Flame), this version was created by Jérémie Galan, Florent Bernard and Jonathan Cohen, who also starred as the bachelor, Marc, in the first season. Ben Stiller is also one of the executive producers of this adaptation. The first season stars Leïla Bekhti, Adèle Exarchopoulos, Marie-Pierre Casey, Florence Foresti, Ana Girardot, Léonie Simaga, Géraldine Nakache, Camille Chamoux, Doria Tillier, Youssef Hajdi, Vincent Dedienne, Laure Calamy, Céline Salette, Angèle, Géraldine Nakache and Pierre Niney. On October 27, 2020, it was renewed for a second season titled Le Flambeau : Les Aventuriers de Chupacabra ( The Torch: The Adventurers of Chupacabra), a spoof of the french version of Survivor. It premiered on May 23, 2022.

References

External links
 "Burning Love" Yahoo! website
 "Burning Love" E! website
 

2012 web series debuts
2013 web series endings
2012 American television series debuts
2013 American television series endings
American dating and relationship reality television series
American comedy web series
Reality television series parodies
Television series based on Internet-based works
Streamy Award-winning channels, series or shows
Webby Award winners
Television series by Red Hour Productions
Yahoo! Screen original programming